Asclepias fascicularis is a species of milkweed known by the common names narrowleaf milkweed and Mexican whorled milkweed. It is a perennial herb that grows in a variety of habitats.

Description

Asclepias fascicularis is a flowering perennial herb sending up many thin, erect stems and bearing distinctive long pointed leaves which are very narrow and often whorled about the stem, giving the plant its common names.

It blooms in clusters of lavender, pale pink, purple, white, to greenish shades of flowers. They have five reflexed lobes that extend down away from the blossom.

The fruit pods are the smooth milkweed type, which split open to spill seeds along with plentiful silky hairs. They bloom from late spring to late summer.

Distribution and habitat
The plant is a common perennial in the Western United States and Baja California. It is found in numerous habitats, including deserts, chaparral and woodlands, and montane locales below .

Uses

Monarch butterflies
Asclepias fascicularis is a specific monarch butterfly food and habitat plant. However, it provides negligible cardenolide content, a set of protective chemicals that reduce the virulence of the OE parasite and bird predation.

Cultivation
Asclepias fascicularis is cultivated by specialty nurseries as an ornamental plant. It is used in butterfly and wildlife gardens, and in native plant and drought tolerant gardens and natural landscaping projects.

References

External links
 
Calflora Database: Asclepias fascicularis (narrow leaf milkweed, Mexican whorled milkweed)
Jepson Manual Treatment of Asclepias fascicularis
Asclepias fascicularis - UC Photos gallery

fascicularis
Butterfly food plants
Flora of California
Flora of Baja California
Flora of Idaho
Flora of Nevada
Flora of Oregon
Flora of Utah
Flora of Washington (state)
Flora of the California desert regions
Flora of the Cascade Range
Flora of the Sierra Nevada (United States)
Natural history of the California chaparral and woodlands
Natural history of the California Coast Ranges
Natural history of the Central Valley (California)
Natural history of the Colorado Desert
Natural history of the Mojave Desert
Natural history of the Peninsular Ranges
Natural history of the San Francisco Bay Area
Natural history of the Santa Monica Mountains
Natural history of the Transverse Ranges
Garden plants of North America
Drought-tolerant plants
Taxa named by Joseph Decaisne